Aswang is a 2011 Filipino action horror thriller film based on the Filipino mythical creature that is a shapeshifting monster usually possessing a combination of the traits of either a vampire, a ghoul, a witch, or different species.
The film is directed and co-written by Jerrold Tarog. It stars Lovi Poe, Paulo Avelino, Albie Casiño, Jillian Ward, Marc Abaya and Niña Jose. The film is a remake of Peque Gallaga's 1992 film of the same name.

The film features a type of aswang called "Abwak". It  can transform from human to a raven-like creature that could fly and move underground as it stalks its victim. The film received generally positive reviews from critics, praising its cinematography and narrative, particularly  Lovi Poe's performance.

Plot
Gabriel and Ahnia are on the run from a trio of hitmen who killed their family. The kids attempt to go to their relatives' place to seek help but get lost along the way. They arrive at the wrong town, one that is being constantly attacked by unknown creatures. During one such attack, they are saved by Hasmin, the resident of a local private plantation in the outskirts of town. She takes the kids to her blind elderly friend and foster mother, Guada, who explains to them what the creatures are.

The creatures are called Abuwaks - a type of aswang that look like normal humans but can burrow underground to attack and transform into raven-like birds. It is later explained that the town's corrupt mayor and the Abuwaks have an agreement of sorts wherein the abuwaks pay him money in exchange for keeping the town underdeveloped and misinformed.

The three hired killers, Gido, Queenie and Daniel, arrive at the same town later on to finish their job. Daniel, a reluctant member due to his family being held hostage by their boss Eddie, meets Hasmin, who he tends to run into from time to time.

With the killers finding them, Hasmin decides to slip the kids into the plantation to avoid capture. However, the plantation turns out to be the nest of the Abuwaks, and Hasmin is one of them although she is benevolent towards humans and defiant of her heritage.

The hired killers then track the kids to the plantation and infiltrate the place. Queenie is able to find Gabriel and Ahnia, but she is caught and tortured by the Abuwaks while the kids escape. Hasmin is forced by their leader Moises to eat Queenie alive but she instead breaks her neck in defiance. Gido and Daniel encounter the other Abuwaks, forcing them to retreat. Gido calls Eddie for backup, which will arrive the next day.

Hasmin is able to find Gabriel and Ahnia, but they are caught during their escape. Moises decides that the kids will be eaten the next day - the day when Hasmin will be married to him.

The next day, Hasmin meets with Daniel to seek his help in getting the kids out of the plantation. Shortly afterwards, two Abuwaks enter the town to find Daniel and Gido. Hasmin changes into an Abuwak to cause panic and distraction, allowing Daniel to escape and Gido to kill the two creatures. The townsfolk evacuate in fear of further attacks - an event which aggravates the Abuwaks' existence due to their own dwindling numbers.

Gido, together with his expected backup, enter the plantation and attack. The attack allows Daniel to rescue Gabriel and Ahnia, and at the same time disrupts Hasmin's wedding.

During their escape, however, Daniel is mortally wounded by an Abuwak pursuer and Ahnia is captured. Hasmin arrives and a dying Daniel says that he is not ready to die as he still needs to save his family from Eddie. Hasmin, the only Abuwak with the power to turn humans into Abuwaks, reluctantly turns Daniel into one to allow him to live.

Daniel and Hasmin then attack Moises who is holding Ahnia hostage. They are able to defeat him and escape outside the plantation.

Gido and his team are overwhelmed by the Abuwaks, although they are able to kill most of them. Gido commits suicide by releasing a grenade as he is being eaten.

Daniel, Hasmin, Gabriel and Ahnia are cornered by Eddie outside the plantation. Eddie reveals that he has already ordered some of his men to kill Daniel's family, and that he plans to kill the four of them. Daniel and Hasmin suddenly transform into their abuwak forms, they then attack and kill Eddie and his henchmen. Gabriel and Ahnia stay with Guada as Daniel and Hasmin travel back to Daniel's hometown.

Cast

Main cast

Supporting cast

Additional cast

Reception

Box office
The film opened at 110 screens earning  on its opening weekend. According to Box Office Mojo, The film reduced to 70 screens and earned  on its second week of showing. The film earned  on its whole theatrical run.

Critical reception
Aswang received generally positive reviews from critics, praising its cinematography and  its narrative. Aswell praising the performance of Lovi Poe.

Earl Villanueva from PEP states in his review that "Aswang is another proof of the Filipino movie industry’s excellence in the horror genre, which should really be the case since we have a rich source of materials in our myths and legends and we have great love affair with the paranormal and everything unexplained."
Ria Limjap from Spot.ph gave a positive review saying that "This intelligent movie will compel the audience to think along with it—just as much as it will entertain, fascinate, and provide much needed escape."
Phillip Cu-Unjieng from Philippine Star describe the film as "..heady, atmospheric foray into the folklore of aswangs and creatures that go bump in the night... and “road bump” in the fields."

Accolades

References

External links

2011 films
2010s Tagalog-language films
2010s English-language films
2011 horror films
Philippine horror films
Philippine monster movies
Filipino zombie films
Films directed by Jerrold Tarog
Films set on farms
Regal Entertainment films
Remakes of Philippine films
2011 multilingual films
Philippine multilingual films